The  is a Japanese order, established on January 4, 1888 by Emperor Meiji of Japan. Since the Order of the Rising Sun at that time was an Order for men, it was established as an Order for women. Originally the order had five classes, but on April 13, 1896 the sixth, seventh and eighth classes were added. 

Until 2003, the Order of the Precious Crown, which had eight ranks, was equivalent to the Order of the Rising Sun and was awarded as a women-only version of the Order of the Rising Sun. In 2003 the Order of the Rising Sun, previously reserved for males, was made available to women as well, and the lowest two classes of the Order of the Precious Crown were abolished. Since 2003, the Order of the Precious Crown has only been given to female members of the imperial family in Japan and female members of the royal family in foreign countries only when it is specifically necessary for diplomatic ceremonies.

Since 2003, the number representing rank included in the official name of the order was removed. As a result, although numbers representing ranks were sometimes used in common names, the formal names such as 勲一等 (Kun-ittō, First Class) and 勲二等 (Kun-nitō, Second Class) were no longer used.

In 1907, medals of the Order of the Crown were bestowed upon twenty-nine Americans who participated in the Russo-Japanese War. This unusual list of honorees was composed of ten women volunteer nurses and nineteen correspondents of American newspapers.

Classes
The first class honour has been typically conferred to female royalty. As originally conceived, the order consisted of eight classes. Unlike its European counterparts, the order may be conferred posthumously.

The badge of the order is a gold oval medallion, with floral designs at its four ends; at the centre is an ancient Japanese crown on a blue background, surrounded by a red ring. It is suspended from a smaller badge, its design varies according to class, on a ribbon in yellow with red stripes near the borders, as a sash on the right shoulder for the 1st class, as a bow on the left shoulder for the other classes.

The star of the order, which is worn only by the first class, has five rays studded with pearls, with floral designs between the rays. The central disc features a Ho-o or phoenix on a blue background, surrounded by a red ring emblazoned with a laurel wreath.

The medal for the 6th and 7th classes are golden bronze.  The face presents the crossed flags of Japan and the Emperor, both of which are surmounted by the Rising Sun.  The obverse presents a conventional monumental shaft, which is flanked by a branch of laurel and a branch of palm.

Selected recipients

First Class, Grand Cordon

 Empress Michiko
 Empress Masako
 Aiko, Princess Toshi
 Mako Komuro
 Princess Kako of Akishino
 Sayako Kuroda
 Maria Teresa, Grand Duchess of Luxembourg
Princess Salote Mafile'o Pilolevu Tuita of Tonga
 Queen Margrethe II of Denmark
 Empress Farah of Iran
 Queen Elizabeth The Queen Mother 
 Queen Paola of Belgium
 Queen Silvia of Sweden
 Queen Sirikit of Thailand
 Queen Máxima of the Netherlands
 Queen Mathilde of Belgium
 Queen Sofia of Spain
 Queen Letizia of Spain
 Queen Sonja of Norway
 Crown Princess Bangja of Korea
 Tuanku Budriah of Malaysia
 Tuanku Bainun of Malaysia
 Tuanku Fauziah of Malaysia 
 Tuanku Hajah Haminah Hamidun of Malaysia
 Princess Srinagarindra of Thailand
 Princess Sirindhorn of Thailand
 Princess Chulabhorn of Thailand
 Anne, Princess Royal
 Princess Margaret, Countess of Snowdon
 Princess Alexandra, The Honourable Lady Ogilvy
 Mette-Marit, Crown Princess of Norway
 Princess Basma bint Talal of Jordan
 Empress Dowager Cixi of China
 Queen Liliuokalani of Hawaii
 Queen Kapiolani of Hawaii
 Queen Máxima of the Netherlands
 Te Atairangikaahu
 Princess Sarvath al-Hassan of Jordan
 Princess Alia bint Hussein of Jordan
 Baroness Margaret Thatcher (former Prime Minister of the United Kingdom)
 Imelda Romualdez Marcos, former First Lady of the Philippines
 Siti Hartinah, former First Lady of the Republic of Indonesia

Second Class
 Noriko Senge
 Princess Tsuguko of Takamado
 Ayako Moriya
 Princess Akiko of Mikasa
 Princess Yōko of Mikasa
 Princess Alexandra of Luxembourg

Third Class
 Joyce Ackroyd, 1918–1991
 Eleanor Jorden, 1920–2009
 Elizabeth Gray Vining, 1902–1999
 Lillian Moller Gilbreth, 1878–1972, Honor conferred 1968
 Yoshi Kasuya, 1894–1994
 Chika Kuroda, 1884–1968
Sugino Yoshiko, 1892-1978
 Kono Yasui, 1880–1971
 Toshiko Yuasa, 1909–1980

Fourth Class
 Michiyo Tsujimura (1888-1969)
 Yvette Giraud (1916-2014)
 Machiko Hasegawa (1920–1992)
 Cayetana Fitz-James Stuart, 18th Duchess of Alba (1926–2014)

Fifth Class
 Fujima Kansuma (b. 1918)

Sixth Class
 Anita Newcomb McGee,(1864–1940) 
 Fumiko Kouka Mikami, (1913-2019)

Seventh Class
 William H. Brill, (1871–1923), Associated Press and Reuter's Telegram Company
 Richard Harding Davis, (1864–1916) Collier's Weekly
 John Fox, Jr., (1862–1919) Scribner's Magazine
 George Kennan, (1845–1924) The Outlook
 Jack London, (1876–1916) Hearst papers.
 Frederick Palmer, (1873–1958) Collier's Weekly
 Herbert Ponting, photographer and journalist, (1870–1935), Harper's Weekly
 James Ricalton, (c. 1844 – 1929) Travel Magazine
 Grant Wallace, (1867–1954) San Francisco Bulletin
 Niijima Yae, (1845–1932)

See also
Order of Chula Chom Klao (Thailand)

Notes

References
 Peterson, James W., Barry C. Weaver and Michael A. Quigley. (2001). Orders and Medals of Japan and Associated States. San Ramon, California: Orders and Medals Society of America. 
 Roth, Mitchel P. and James Stuart Olson. (1997).  Historical Dictionary of War Journalism. Westport, Connecticut: Greenwood Publishing Group.

External links
 Japan, Cabinet Office: Order of the Precious Crown
 Japan Mint

Awards established in 1888
 
Orders, decorations, and medals of Japan
Precious Crown, Order of the
Precious Crown, Order of the
1888 establishments in Japan